The 1856 United States presidential election in Arkansas was held on November 4, 1856. Arkansas voters chose four electors to represent the state in the Electoral College, which chose the president and vice president.

Arkansas voted for the Democratic nominee James Buchanan, who received 67% of the vote.

Republican Party nominee John C. Frémont was not on the ballot.

Results

See also
 United States presidential elections in Arkansas

References

1856
Arkansas
1856 in Arkansas